Vladimir Sokhatsky (born December 29, 1989) is a Russian professional ice hockey goaltender who is currently playing for Saryarka Karaganda in the Supreme Hockey League (VHL). He most notably played with Salavat Yulaev Ufa of the Kontinental Hockey League (KHL).

External links

1989 births
Living people
Avtomobilist Yekaterinburg players
Salavat Yulaev Ufa players
Sportspeople from Ufa
Toros Neftekamsk players
Russian ice hockey goaltenders